Robert Hands is an Olivier Award-nominated British actor based in London. He trained at the prestigious Bristol Old Vic theatre school. His career has spanned over twenty years during which time he has played leading roles in film, television, and both classical and musical theatre in London’s West End. He played Sir Robin in the original London cast of Spamalot.

He is probably best known for his television roles in Sharpe's Battle, Doctor Who and The House of Eliott, as well as the films Charlotte Gray, Anna and the King, and the Academy Award-nominated (Best Picture) Shine.
He is also a member of Edward Hall's world-renowned all-male Shakespeare company Propeller.

From 2019 to 2020, Hands was in the UK cast of Come From Away.

Acting credits

Theatre

Television

Film

See also 
 List of British actors

References 

 

British male television actors
British male film actors
Year of birth missing (living people)
Living people
Place of birth missing (living people)